

Regular season results

Standings after regular season
 Juan Carlos Mortensen (47)
 Kathy Liebert (47)
 Ted Forrest (40)
 Johnny Chan (38)
 David Sklansky (35)
 Freddy Deeb (33)
 Scotty Nguyen (31)
 David Grey (30)
 Todd Brunson (29)
 Mimi Tran (28)
 Cyndy Violette (26)
 Mike Sexton (25)
 Huck Seed (24)
 Eli Elezra (23)
 Dewey Tomko (22)
 Chau Giang (22)
 Barry Greenstein (22)
 Doyle Brunson (21)
 Bobby Hoff (19)
 Tommy Wang (17)
 Mike Caro (16)
 John Myung (12)
 Chris Moneymaker (10)
 Antonio Esfandiari (7)

Single-table invitational
On February 5, 2006, NBC aired an 8-player single-table invitational freeroll, winner-take-all tournament for $500,000. It led into the Super Bowl and featured a countdown clock to the big game. The 8 players competing were:

Total winnings
 Johnny Chan: $515,000
 Todd Brunson: $235,000
 Juan Carlos Mortensen: $100,000
 Scotty Nguyen: $80,000
 Ted Forrest: $60,000
 Kathy Liebert: $60,000
 Freddy Deeb: $50,000
 David Sklansky: $50,000
 David Grey: $20,000
 Mimi Tran: $20,000
 Eli Elezra: $10,000
 Huck Seed: $10,000

Poker Superstars